Mary Mosiman (born February 13, 1962) is an American politician who served as the 32nd State Auditor of Iowa. A Republican, she was appointed by Governor Terry Branstad to the position of Auditor of State on May 13, 2013, filling a vacancy created when David A. Vaudt resigned.  She was elected to a full term of office in 2014. She was defeated by Democrat Rob Sand in 2018.

Previously, she had served as Story County auditor winning election in 2000 and re-election in 2004 and 2008, and as Deputy Iowa Secretary of State from 2010 to 2013.

Mosiman was born and currently resides in Ames, Iowa and grew up in Hubbard, Iowa.  She earned her B. A. in Business-Accounting in 1999 and became a Certified Public Accountant in 2003.

Electoral history

References

External links
Iowa Auditor of State
Mosiman's Official Biography

1962 births
21st-century American politicians
County auditors in the United States
Iowa Republicans
Living people
Politicians from Ames, Iowa
People from Hardin County, Iowa
State Auditors of Iowa
Women in Iowa politics
21st-century American women politicians
County officials in Iowa